Purple chip stock is a kind of stock in Hong Kong which is both blue chip (Hang Seng Index constituents) and red chip (state controlled companies incorporated outside of Mainland China) stock listed in Hong Kong Stock Exchange.

Examples of "purple chip" stocks 
China Merchants Holdings (International)
CITIC Pacific
China Resources
China Unicom
China National Offshore Oil Corporation
China Netcom
China Mobile
COSCO Pacific (2003–2014)

See also 
Chip
 Green chip
 P chip
 S chip

Stock market